Nvidia CUDA Compiler (NVCC) is a proprietary compiler by Nvidia intended for use with CUDA. CUDA code runs on both the CPU and GPU. NVCC separates these two parts and sends host code (the part of code which will be run on the CPU) to a C compiler like GCC or Intel C++ Compiler (ICC) or Microsoft Visual C++ Compiler, and sends the device code (the part which will run on the GPU) to the GPU. The device code is further compiled by NVCC. NVCC is based on LLVM. According to Nvidia provided documentation, nvcc in version 7.0 supports many language constructs that are defined by the C++11 standard and a few C99 features as well. In version 9.0 several more constructs from the C++14 standard are supported.

Any source file containing CUDA language extensions (.cu) must be compiled with nvcc. NVCC is a compiler driver which works by invoking all the necessary tools and compilers like cudacc, g++, cl, etc. NVCC can output either C code (CPU Code) that must then be compiled with the rest of the application using another tool or PTX or object code directly. An executable with CUDA code requires: the CUDA core library (cuda) and the CUDA runtime library (cudart).

Other widely used libraries:
 CUBLAS: BLAS implementation
 CUFFT: FFT implementation
 CUDPP (Data Parallel Primitives): Reduction, Scan, Sort.
 Thrust: Reduction, Scan, Sort.

See also 
 OpenCL
 Heterogeneous System Architecture
 CUDA binary (cubin) – a type of fat binary

References 

 David B. Kirk, and Wen-mei W. Hwu. Programming massively parallel processors: a hands-on approach. Morgan Kaufmann, 2010.
 Nvidia Documentation on nvcc. https://docs.nvidia.com/cuda/cuda-compiler-driver-nvcc/
 CUDPP. https://web.archive.org/web/20181117222643/http://gpgpu.org/developer/cudpp

Nvidia software
Compilers